Röslau is a municipality  in the district of Wunsiedel in Bavaria in Germany.

References

Wunsiedel (district)